Karachi Area Control Centre is one of two Area Control Centers in Pakistan operated by the Pakistan Civil Aviation Authority and is based in Terminal 1 at Jinnah International Airport in Karachi. Karachi ACC air traffic controllers provide en route and terminal control services to aircraft in the Karachi Flight Information Region. The Karachi FIR airspace covers Pakistani airspace between the 30° North to 23° North. To the north is the Lahore FIR. To the east is the Delhi FIR. To the south is the Muscat FIR and to the west are the Tehran FIR and Kabul FIRs.

Sectors
Karachi ACC if divided into 4 control sectors:
 Karachi Sector North
 Karachi Sector West
 Karachi Sector East
 Karachi Sector South (only active between 1830 and 0230 UTC)

Services
Karachi ACC is equipped with Indra's Aircon 2100 radar system. and provides air traffic control services to all air traffic and its airspace. It also expedites sequencing of arrivals and departures along STARs (Standard Terminal Arrival Routes) and SIDs (Standard Instrument Departures). Certain exceptions include military airspace and lower-level airspace controlled by local airport towers and TRACONs. Karachi ACC is also part of the Bobcat Air Traffic Flow Management program, which helps to optimize traffic flow through Kabul FIR. Due to lower navigation and surveillance capabilities, and limited ATS provision capabilities, Kabul FIR often becomes very congested airspace with limited number of operating routes and flight levels. Whereas the level allocation is made by AeroThai, the primary responsibility for tactical management of level allocation rests with Karachi ACC.

Airports
The Karachi ACC assumes control of the following airports:

Controlled, IFR/IFR, IFR/VFR and VFR/VFR separation, VFR: Mode C and ATC clearance required
Karachi Jinnah International Airport
Dera Ghazi Khan International Airport
Quetta International Airport
Gwadar International Airport
Turbat International Airport
Controlled, only IFR/IFR spacing
Hyderabad Airport
Jacobabad Airport
Moenjodaro Airport
Nawabshah Airport
Panjgur Airport
Sukkur Begum Nusrat Bhutto Airport
Uncontrolled, clearances are required to enter or leave airspace.
Dalbandin Airport
Jiwani Airport
Kadanwari Airport
Khuzdar Airport
Ormara Airport
Pasni Airport
Sawan Airport
Sehwan Sharif Airport
Shamsi Airfield
Sibi Airport
Sindhri Airport
Sui Airport

See also
Lahore Area Control Center
Airports of Pakistan
Civil Aviation Authority

References

External links
 Civil Aviation Authority of Pakistan - Official site
 Karachi Air Traffic Control | LiveATC.net

Air traffic control centers
Air traffic control in Pakistan
Jinnah International Airport
Aviation in Karachi